Groom is a town in Carson County, Texas, United States. The population was 574 at the 2010 census. It is part of the Amarillo, Texas Metropolitan Statistical Area.

Geography

Groom is located in the southeastern corner of Carson County at  (35.203112, –101.106710). Interstate 40 bypasses the town to the north, with access from Exits 110 through 114. Historic Route 66 (Business Route 40) passes through the center of town.

Demographics

As of the census of 2000, there were 587 people, 240 households, and 178 families residing in the town. The population density was 778.7 people per square mile (302.2/km2). There were 290 housing units at an average density of 384.7 per square mile (149.3/km2). The racial makeup of the town was 94.72% white, 0.17% Native American, 0.17% Asian, 2.90% from other races, and 2.04% from two or more races. Hispanic or Latino of any race were 4.77% of the population.

There were 240 households, out of which 31.3% had children under the age of 18 living with them, 63.3% were married couples living together, 7.5% had a female householder with no husband present, and 25.8% were non-families. 25.8% of all households were made up of individuals, and 16.3% had someone living alone who was 65 years of age or older. The average household size was 2.45 and the average family size was 2.92.

In the town, the population was spread out, with 26.6% under the age of 18, 6.8% from 18 to 24, 23.9% from 25 to 44, 22.0% from 45 to 64, and 20.8% who were 65 years of age or older. The median age was 40 years. For every 100 females, there were 95.0 males. For every 100 females age 18 and over, there were 93.3 males.

The median income for a household in the town was $31,705, and the median income for a family was $39,063. Males had a median income of $30,577 versus $24,500 for females. The per capita income for the town was $15,593. About 9.4% of families and 13.2% of the population were below the poverty line, including 22.0% of those under age 18 and 11.8% of those age 65 or over.

Landmarks

Giant cross
 A 19-story cross erected by The Cross of Our Lord Jesus Christ Ministries is located next to Interstate 40 northwest of the town limits. Surrounding the base of the cross are life-sized statues of the 14 Stations of the Cross. In addition to the giant cross and the Stations of the Cross, there is also a visitor center, gift shop and amphitheater located at the site.

Inspired by this cross, residents of Effingham, Illinois, erected a similar cross that is  taller. While some tourist brochures claim this cross to be the largest in the Western Hemisphere it is smaller than the cross erected in the Valle de los Caídos in Spain and elevated  overground. The cross is also  shorter than the  cross at the Mission Nombre de Dios in St. Augustine, Florida, and shorter than the  Lakeuden Risti cross-shaped church tower in Seinäjoki, Finland. The movie Leap of Faith was filmed on location near the site of the cross in Groom, but the movie was filmed before the cross was built.

Leaning water tower

Also in Groom one can find a leaning water tower, sometimes called The Leaning Tower of Texas or The Leaning Tower of Britten, which currently serves as a decorative item and roadside attraction. The leaning tower was originally a functioning water tower which was slated for demolition until Ralph Britten bought it and moved it to serve as a sign for his truck stop and tourist information center (located on a stretch of interstate that was once a part of U.S. Route 66). This truck stop can still be seen, set back off the road behind the tower, now boarded up and in disrepair following a devastating fire decades ago.

The leaning water tower still remains a popular target for cameras, and the town of Groom turns on a large colored star mounted on the top around Christmas time. The water tower is a common image from Route 66 photography books.

Education
The Town of Groom is served by the Groom Independent School District.

History

Early exploration
The route from Fort Smith, Arkansas, to Santa Fe, New Mexico, along the Canadian River was charted circa 1849 by Captain Randolph Barnes Marcy. Published in 1859, Marcy's book, The Prairie Traveler: A Handbook for Overland Expeditions, contained maps and illustrations of routes between the Mississippi and the Pacific and was used as a basic manual by westward-bound wagon trains and travelers for years.

Colonel B. B. Groom
Colonel B. B. Groom, an experienced cattleman near Lexington, Kentucky, leased from the New York and Texas Land Company  of land in Hutchinson, Carson, Gray, and Roberts counties in the Texas Panhandle in 1882, resulting in the organization of the Francklyn Land and Cattle Company. Groom purchased an estimated 1,300 head of shorthorns in 1882 and selected the Diamond F brand, approved by the Francklyn officials and filed as the company's brand in October 1882. Unfortunately, Groom's vision of the finest and most desirable cattle ranch in the United States did not materialize for him. The Francklyn Land and Cattle Company became insolvent in 1886. The bondholders foreclosed and organized a new company known as White Deer Lands (later White Deer Land Company), under the management of the agent Timothy Dwight Hobart, one of the subsequent founders of Pampa, Texas.

Harrison Groom
Colonel Groom's son, Harrison Groom, established a camp at the edge of a little lake just west of the present town of White Deer.

The town
The site of Groom was chosen in 1902, along the route of the Chicago, Rock Island and Gulf Railway. Groom was first incorporated in 1911.

Notable people

 Leland Chapman, Bounty Hunter
 Steve Haskins, professional golfer

See also

 List of municipalities in Texas

References

External links

Towns in Carson County, Texas
Towns in Texas
Towns in Amarillo metropolitan area
Monumental crosses in the United States